This is a list of airlines operating in Luxembourg as of 10 August 2005.

Scheduled airlines

Charter airlines

Cargo airlines

Air rescue

See also
 List of airlines
 List of defunct airlines of Luxembourg
 List of defunct airlines of Europe

References

Luxembourg
Airlines
Airlines
Luxembourg